Air Club International Ltd. (or ACI) was a Canadian charter airline that operated from 1993 to 1998.

History
The airline was established in 1993, headquartered at Mirabel International Airport (at the time, Montréal, Québec, main international airport) and managed by a group that included several former Nationair executives and presided by Claude Lévesque, to operate charter flights between Canada, Europe and the Caribbean.

The carrier's first airplane was an A310-300 acquired via Airbus Leasing and used for routes towards Europe, such as London.  Later, the airline obtained additional A310 aircraft and, late in January 1995, began using a Boeing 747-200 leased from Japan Airlines from its Vancouver base.

As part of a contract with Air India, Air Club operated flights from India to several international destinations, starting in 1994. Between seasons, Air Club also operated different contractual flights for various organizations.

Air Club ceased operations in 1998 and returned the leased aircraft to the lessors.

Destinations
Amsterdam
Berlin
London
Paramaribo
Paris
Brussels
Glasgow
Vancouver
Frankfurt/Main
Panama city, Panama

Fleet
4 Airbus A310
2 Boeing 747-200

See also 
 List of defunct airlines of Canada

References

External links

Air Club International at Airliners.net
Air Club International at timetableimages.com

Defunct airlines of Canada
Airlines established in 1993
Airlines disestablished in 1998
1993 establishments in Quebec
1998 disestablishments in Quebec
Canadian companies established in 1993
Canadian companies disestablished in 1998